This article lists the flags of the various colonies and states that have existed in South Africa since 1652, as well as other flags pertaining to South Africa, including governmental, military, police and provincial flags.

Overview

The following flags have been used as the national flag of the Union of South Africa and the Republic of South Africa:

History

Historical flags (1652–1928)

 Many flags were used in South Africa prior to political unification in 1910.
 The original Dutch East India Company colony at the Cape of Good Hope (1652–1795) flew the Dutch flag, with the VOC logo in the centre. This flag was also flown during the period of Batavian Republic rule (1803–06).
 The Boer Republics, i.e. the Orange Free State (1854–1902), the South African Republic (1857–1902), Stellaland (1882–85), Goshen (1883–85), the Nieuwe Republiek (1884–88), and the Klein Vrystaat (1886–1891) had their own flags. Several derived from the Dutch flag.
 The British colonies that existed in the 19th century flew the British flags, and from the early 1870s some, i.e. Natal, Cape Colony, and later the Orange River Colony and the Transvaal, added their own colonial flag badges.
 The Union of South Africa, formed in 1910, initially used a red ensign defaced with a badge depicting the Union coat of arms. The first South African national flag, introduced in 1928, superseded it.

National flag (1928–1994)

 The Hertzog administration introduced the flag after several years of political controversy. Approved by Parliament in 1927, it was first hoisted on 31 May 1928.
 The flag reflected the Union's predecessors. The basis was the Prince's Flag (royal tricolour) of the Netherlands, with the addition of a Union Jack to represent the Cape and Natal, the former Orange Free state flag, and the former South African Republic flag.
 Until 1957, the flag was flown subordinate to the British Union Jack.
 The flag remained unchanged when South Africa became a republic on 31 May 1961.

Homeland flags (1966–1994)
 Nine of the ten Black 'homelands' which were created inside South African Federation under the apartheid system, had their own flags, i.e. Transkei (1966–94), Bophuthatswana (1973–94), Ciskei (1973–94), Gazankulu (1973–94), Venda (1973–94), Lebowa (1974–94), QwaQwa (1975–94), KwaZulu (1977–94), and KwaNdebele (1982–94). KaNgwane was the only homeland that never adopted its own distinctive flag, instead using the national flag of South Africa.
 All these flags became obsolete when South Africa reincorporated the homelands on 27 April 1994.

Sporting flags (1992–1994)
As a result of the sporting boycott of South Africa over its policy of apartheid, South Africa did not participate in the Olympic Games between 1964 and 1988. The country was re-admitted to the Olympic movement in 1991. As a result of a dispute over what flag and national anthem to use following readmission, the team participated in the 1992 Summer Olympic Games under a specially designed sporting flag. The flag consisted of a white field charged with grey diamond, which represented the countries mineral wealth, three cascading bands of blue, red and green, which represented the sea, the land and agriculture respectively and the Olympic rings. This flag was also used to represent the South African team at the 1992 Summer Paralympics. Team uniforms included the emblem of Olympic Committee of South Africa, which depicted Olympic rings surrounded by olive branches, with the name of the country above. The team would use Beethoven's "Ode to Joy" as its victory anthem at these games. At the 1994 Winter Games, South Africa participated under the flag of its Olympic committee.

National flag (1994–present) 
 South Africa was reconstituted as a unitary democratic state, with equal rights for men and women of all races in 1994. The old flag's long association with the apartheid era made it unacceptable for the new dispensation, and the State Herald, Frederick Brownell therefore designed a new flag. Approved by the Transitional Executive Council (TEC) on 20 March 1994, and officially authorised by state president F. W. de Klerk on 20 April 1994, it was officially hoisted a week later, on 27 April 1994.
 The new flag was intended as an interim measure, but it proved so popular that when the final Constitution was prepared in 1996, it became the permanent flag.

Governmental flags

Civil Air Ensign

Military flags

South African Defence Force

South African National Defence Force

National Defence Department

South African Army

South African Air Force

South African Navy

Police flags

South African Police

South African Police Service

Provincial flags

1910–1994
Between 1910 and 1994, South Africa was divided into four provinces, Cape Province, Natal, Orange Free State and Transvaal. These provinces had their own coat of arms but not their own flags.

1994–present
In April 1994, South Africa was divided into nine provinces. Each province was granted a coat of arms, in most cases designed by State Herald Frederick Brownell. Currently only one province, Mpumalanga, has adopted an official provincial flag, doing so in February 1996. The other eight provinces can be represented by white banners charged with their coats of arms.

Proposed flags

Flags proposed in the 1910s

Flags proposed in the 1920s

Flags from the 1925/1926 Public Flag Competition
The government of South Africa opened a competition open to the public. While the "Walker Flag" had some support, ultimately none of the designs were chosen.

Flags from the 1927 Flag Commission
In 1927, the government set up a flag commission, which came up with three designs, the "Cross Flags". Due to the opposition insisting on the Union Jack being featured, the commission created three more designs at the Flag Conference in  April and May of 1927.

Flags put forward in 1927 by SAP, Government, and Senate
In June of 1927, the South African Party proposed a flag with four elements divided by a white cross, and the government proposed a version with a shield defacing the Prinsenvlag. The Senate then combined elements from both into a third proposal. Finally, in October of 1927, a compromise was reached and the Flag of South Africa (1928–1994) was introduced.

Flags proposed in the 1960s
In the 1960s, there was pressure to change the flag, particularly from Afrikaners who resented the fact that the Union Flag was a part of the flag. The then prime minister, Dr Hendrik Verwoerd, had his assistant secretary, HC Blatt, design a "clean" flag, comprising three vertical stripes of orange, white, and blue, with a leaping springbok over a wreath of six proteas in the centre, designed, but he was assassinated before he could introduce it, and the project died with him in 1966.

Flags proposed in the 1990s

1992 Contest by the "Natal Witness"
The Natal Witness newspaper held a competition for a new flag design, which was won by Lalsingh Ramlukan with a design featuring four cupped hands and a blue dove.

Designs shortlisted by the Commission on National Symbols

The Commission on National Symbols proposed six designs in October 1993.

Designs Proposed Graphic design studios

A group of professional graphic design studios proposed several flag designs in November 1993.

Designs shortlisted by the Joint Technical Working Committee

The Joint Technical Working Committee shortlisted 5 designs in February 1994. A further design was proposed also by the African National Congress (ANC) based on a design shortlisted in October 1993. Proposal 4, designed by State Herald Frederick Brownell, was submitted to the Transitional Executive Council and approved as the final choice for the new flag.

See also

 Flag of South Africa
 Flag of South Africa (1928–1994)
 National symbols of South Africa
 Coat of arms of South Africa
 Flag of the South African Republic
 Flag of the Orange Free State
 Flag of the Cape Colony
 Flag of Stellaland
 Flag of the Natalia Republic

Notes

References
 Beckett, D. (2002)  Flying with Pride.
 Brownell, F.G. (1993) National and Provincial Symbols.
 Burgers, A.P. (1997)  Sovereign Flags of South Africa.
 Burgers, A.P. (2008).  The South African Flag Book.
 Pama, C. (1965)  Lions and Virgins.
 Pama, C. (1984) Die Vlae van Suid-Afrika.

External links

 Southern African Vexillological Association (SAVA)
 South Africa - national index at Flags of the World

 
South African heraldry
Flags
South Africa
Historical flags